Bakary Koné (born 27 April 1988) is a Burkinabé former professional footballer who played as a centre back.

Club career

Early career
Koné played on youth side for CFTPK Abidjan and joined in 2004 to Etoile Filante where he began his professional career in 2005.

Guingamp
In July 2006 Koné signed for En Avant de Guingamp. He played his first game for Guingamp on 11 May 2007 against Tours FC in the Ligue 2. Whilst at Guingamp, then in Ligue 2, Koné played in the 2009 Coupe de France Final in which they beat Rennes. After making 112 appearances for the club from five seasons, he was signed by Lyon in 2011.

Lyon
Koné joined Olympique Lyonnais on 11 August 2011 and signed a five-year deal for 3.8 million euro transfer fee. He scored his first goal with Lyon in the UEFA Champions League play-offs against Rubin Kazan on 24 August 2011. He scored his second goal, again in the Champions League in group stage against Dinamo Zagreb on 27 September of the same year. During his five years at Lyon, he made 89 appearances for the club and also scored 9 goals. He left the club in 2016 after his regular contract ran out.

Malaga CF
On 27 June 2016, Koné signed a three-year deal with La Liga side Málaga CF. On 26 August 2017, he moved to Ligue 1 side RC Strasbourg on a season-long loan. On 28 July 2018, Koné terminated his contract with Málaga.

MKE Ankaragücü

Koné joined Turkish club MKE Ankaragücü during the August transfer window. He spent one season in Turkey and made 14 appearances for the club.

Arsenal Tula

On 28 January 2019, he signed a 1.5-year contract with the Russian Premier League club Arsenal Tula. On 2 December 2019, he was removed by Arsenal from their league registration list after only appearing in one league game in 2019.

Kerala Blasters FC

On 21 October 2020, Indian Super League club Kerala Blasters FC announced the signing of Bakary on a season long contract. He is the second Burkinabe to sign for an Indian Super League club. He made his debut for the Blasters against ATK-Mohun Bagan on 20 November 2020 which ended 1-0 in favour of ATK- Mohun Bagan. On 11 June 2021, it was announced that Bakary along with five other players has left the club.

International career
He made his debut for the Burkino Faso on 7 October 2006 at the age of 18. He played the entire 90 minutes where Burkino Faso defeated Senegal 1:0 in the Africa Cup of Nations Qualification. He was the member of the Burkino Faso squad that played in the 2013 Africa Cup of Nations. He played the entire minutes in the tournament and Burkino Faso became the runners up of the tournament for the first time in the history. In the final he won the Fair Player of the Match Award. On 14 November 2014, Bakary Koné captained his national side for the first time in an African Nations Cup Qualification match against Angola. With 83 appearances, Koné  is currently the third most capped player for his country.

Career statistics

Honours
Guingamp
Coupe de France: 2008–09

Lyon
Coupe de France: 2011–12
Trophée des Champions: 2012

Burkina-Faso
African Cup of Nations runner-up: 2013, third place: 2017
Individual

 Africa Cup of Nations Team of the Tournament: 2013

References

External links

 
 
 
 

1988 births
Living people
Sportspeople from Ouagadougou
Association football central defenders
Burkinabé footballers
Burkina Faso international footballers
2010 Africa Cup of Nations players
2012 Africa Cup of Nations players
2013 Africa Cup of Nations players
Ligue 1 players
Ligue 2 players
La Liga players
Russian Premier League players
En Avant Guingamp players
Olympique Lyonnais players
Étoile Filante de Ouagadougou players
Málaga CF players
RC Strasbourg Alsace players
MKE Ankaragücü footballers
FC Arsenal Tula players
Burkinabé expatriates in France
Burkinabé expatriates in Ivory Coast
Expatriate footballers in Ivory Coast
Expatriate footballers in France
Expatriate footballers in Spain
Expatriate footballers in Turkey
Expatriate footballers in Russia
Burkinabé expatriate sportspeople in Ivory Coast
Burkinabé expatriate sportspeople in France
Burkinabé expatriate sportspeople in Spain
Burkinabé expatriate sportspeople in Turkey
Burkinabé expatriate sportspeople in Russia
2015 Africa Cup of Nations players
2017 Africa Cup of Nations players
Kerala Blasters FC players
21st-century Burkinabé people